Kierstan Bell (born March 16, 2000) is an American professional basketball player who plays for the Las Vegas Aces in the Women's National Basketball Association (WNBA). She played college basketball at Florida Gulf Coast and Ohio State.

College career

Ohio State
Bell was rated as the 6th overall recruit in the nation by ESPN HoopGurlz and the 18th overall by ProspectsNation.com in 2019. Bell signed to play with Ohio State out of high school. Bell had an outstanding freshman season for the Buckeyes, being named to the Big Ten All-Freshman Team, Honorable Mention All-Big Ten Team, and 3-Time Big Ten Player of the Week.

Following her freshman season, Bell announced that she was entering the transfer portal and leaving Ohio State.

Florida Gulf Coast University
On May 5, 2020, Bell signed to continue her collegiate basketball career with Florida Gulf Coast.

During her sophomore campaign, Bell produced the best season in program history for the Eagles. She averaged 24.3 points, 10.6 rebounds, 1.9 steals, and 2.3 blocks. She was named the ASUN Player of the Week 6 different times and named the ASUN Newcomer of the Week a record 10 times. Bell was also named the ASUN Player of the Year, Newcomer of the Year, the Becky Hammon Mid-Major Player of the Year, WBCA Honorable Mention All-American, AP Honorable Mention All-American, and USBWA Honorable Mention All-American.

Prior to her junior year, ESPN named Bell the 16th best women's college basketball player for the 2021–2022 season. Bell averaged 22.8 points and 7.3 rebounds during the year, but also missed time due to a partial torn meniscus. Bell also set a new ASUN record for the number of Player of the Week Honors during the season. On January 18, 2022, Bell was awarded the 11th Player of the Week honor of career.

In January 2022, Bell announced she would be declaring early for the WNBA Draft. Bell was projected to go in the first round by multiple mock drafts.

College statistics

Professional career

Las Vegas Aces
In the 2022 WNBA Draft, Bell was taken 11th overall by the Las Vegas Aces.

Adelaide Lighting
Bell signed with the Adelaide Lighting for the 2022/2023 WNBL season, she was cut by Adelaide in December 2022.

WNBA career statistics

Regular season

|-
|style="text-align:left;background:#afe6ba;"| 2022†
| align="left" | Las Vegas
| 21 || 1 || 5.8 || .303 || .136 || 1.000 || 0.9 || 0.3 || 0.1 || 0.1 || 0.2 || 1.3
|-
| align="left" | Career
| align="left" | 1 year, 1 team
| 21 || 1 || 5.8 || .303 || .136 || 1.000 || 0.9 || 0.3 || 0.1 || 0.1 || 0.2 || 1.3

Playoffs

|-
|style="text-align:left;background:#afe6ba;"| 2022†
| align="left" | Las Vegas
| 4 || 0 || 4.8 || .667 || .600 || .000 || 1.3 || 0.3 || 0.0 || 0.0 || 0.5 || 2.8
|-
| align="left" | Career
| align="left" | 1 year, 1 team
| 4 || 0 || 4.8 || .667 || .600 || .000 || 1.3 || 0.3 || 0.0 || 0.0 || 0.5 || 2.8

References

External links
WNBA bio
FGCU Eagles bio
Ohio State Buckeyes bio

2000 births
Living people
American women's basketball players
Basketball players from Ohio
Guards (basketball)
Ohio State Buckeyes women's basketball players
Florida Gulf Coast Eagles women's basketball players
Las Vegas Aces draft picks
Las Vegas Aces players
People from Alliance, Ohio